Alexandre Lézine (born 4 July 1906 - 4 March 1972) was a French  architect, historian and archaeologist of Russian origin.

Career 
Lézine graduated with a degree in archeology in 1937. He was the main architect of the historical monuments of Tunisia. As a historian and archaeologist, he published numerous works on ancient monuments and monuments of the Muslim period, taking an interest in the ancient palaces of Cairo.

From 1945 to 1951 Lézine participated in Pierre Montet's mission in Tanis. In the 1950s, he participated in the excavation of Carthage. His activity there was mainly focused on the excavation and restoration of the Antonine baths with Noël Duval and Gilbert Charles-Picard. Excavation of the old Évreux and restoration of the monuments of the Eure.

In 1949 he was named , a French title for senior civil servants belonging to the body of state architects and urban planners focusing on heritage monuments. Between 1950 and 1964 he worked as an architect at the Tunisian Department of Antiquities, including in 1952 as principal architect of the Historical Monuments of Tunisia. From 1957 to 1964, he as appointed as advisor to the Tunisian government at the Department of Antiquities and Art; he also lectured on Islamic architecture at the University of Tunis. He served as the Director of the Service of Historical Monuments of Tunisia between 1950 and 1956. From 1957 to 1972 he was Senior Research Fellow at the French National Centre for Scientific Research (CNRS). Lézine was appointed Master of Research at the CNRS in 1957, and was an honorary member of the French Académie des Inscriptions et Belles-Lettres from 1962 until his death in 1972. In 1962 he was appointed UNESCO expert in Afghanistan where he was responsible for inspection and restoration of monuments.

Lézine was decorated with the Croix de Guerre 1939–1945.

Publications 

 En collaboration avec J. Verrier, Notes sur la consolidation des monuments historiques de Tunisie, éd. Direction des antiquités et arts de Tunisie, Tunis, 1953
 Le ribat de Sousse, suivi de notes sur le ribat de Monastir, éd. Direction des antiquités et arts de Tunisie, Tunis, notes et documents, t. XIV, 1956
 Architecture romaine d'Afrique : Recherches et mises au point, éd. PUF, Paris, 1961
 Mahdiya, recherches d'archéologie islamique, éd. C. Klinksieck, Paris, 1965
 Architecture de l'Ifriqiya, recherches sur les monuments aghlabides, éd. C. Klinksieck, Paris, 1966
 Carthage. Utique - Études d'architecture et d'urbanisme, éd. du CNRS, Paris, 1968
 Mahdiya, éd. Société tunisienne de diffusion, Tunis, 1968
 Sousse, les monuments musulmans, éd. Cérès Productions, Tunis, 1968
 Thuburbo Majus, éd. Société tunisienne de diffusion, Tunis, 1968
 Les thermes d'Antonin à Carthage, éd. Société tunisienne de diffusion, Tunis, 1969
 Utique, éd. Société tunisienne de diffusion, Tunis, 1970
 Trois palais d'époque ottomane au Caire, éd. Institut français d’archéologie orientale, Le Caire, 1972

References

See also 

Alexandre Lézine (1906-1972) Biography

Corresponding members of the Académie des Inscriptions et Belles-Lettres
Academic staff of Tunis University
French archaeologists
20th-century French historians
20th-century French architects
Phoenician-punic archaeologists
1906 births
1972 deaths
Emigrants from the Russian Empire to France